Farwa Ki ABC is a 2015 Pakistani romantic-comedy series that originally aired on A-Plus Entertainment from 24 July 2015 to 18 December 2015. It is produced by Sadia Jabbar under Sadia Jabbar Productions and stars Sonya Hussain, Adnan Jaffar and Ahmed Hassan in pivot roles.

Summary
The series focusing on education and its importance. It is based on a comedy story of a girl named Farwa (Sonya Hussain) who is weak in English and a shy girl, she loves to study but due to her poor skills she always fails.

Cast
Sonya Hussain as Farwa 
Adnan Jaffar as Mustansar (Farwa's English Teacher)
 Ahmed Hassan as Gogi
Khalid Anam as Saeed as Farwa's Father
Irsa Ghazal as Begum (Farwa's Mother)
Yasir Mazhar as Rashid (Farwa's Brother)
Faryal Mehmood
Shehryar Zaidi

References

Pakistani drama television series
Pakistani comedy television series
Pakistani romance television series